Jim Jess (born 25 January 1955) is a retired Australian rules football player who played in the VFL between 1976 and 1988 for the Richmond Football Club.

Jess was commonly referred to as 'The Ghost'.

References 

 Hogan P: The Tigers Of Old, Richmond FC, Melbourne 1996

External links
 
 

Living people
Richmond Football Club players
Richmond Football Club Premiership players
Burnie Football Club players
Victorian State of Origin players
All-Australians (1953–1988)
1955 births
Australian rules footballers from Victoria (Australia)
One-time VFL/AFL Premiership players